André Souris (10 July 1899 – 12 February 1970) was a Belgian composer, conductor, musicologist, and writer associated with the surrealist movement.

Biography
Souris was born in Marchienne-au-Pont, Belgium, and studied at the Conservatory in Brussels from 1911 to 1918, winning first prizes in music history (1915), harmony (1916), counterpoint and fugue (1917), and the violin (1918). Following postgraduate studies in composition and orchestration with Gilson, he won the Rubens prize in 1927. This enabled him to move to Paris, where he sought out the leaders of the avant garde. He took conducting lessons with Scherchen in 1935, and was a conductor for the Belgian radio from 1937 to 1946 .

Up until 1923 Souris composed a great deal of music under the strong influence of Claude Debussy, but after discovering other musical styles at the Pro Arte Concerts, he repudiated these early works and adopted Erik Satie and Igor Stravinsky as his models. Joining the Belgian surrealists of the group Correspondance around Paul Nougé, he wrote deliberately banal music, beginning with the Choral, marche et galop for four brass instruments (1925), which became his op. 1—a work clearly indebted to L'Histoire du soldat (Vanhulst 2001). He lived in Italy, France, and Austria, and died in Paris .

References

Further reading

External links
 
 Koninklijk Conservatorium Brussel now houses most works and manuscripts of Souris, after the bankruptcy of CeBeDeM in 2015.

1899 births
1970 deaths
Belgian composers
Male composers
Belgian film score composers
Male film score composers
Belgian writers in French
Royal Conservatory of Brussels alumni
Academic staff of the Royal Conservatory of Brussels
Belgian surrealist writers
Musicians from Charleroi
20th-century composers
20th-century Belgian male musicians
Writers from Charleroi